René Joseph Napoléon Brunelle (January 22, 1920 – April 14, 2010) was a Canadian politician, who represented Cochrane North in the Legislative Assembly of Ontario from 1958 to 1981 as a Progressive Conservative member.

Background
Brunelle was born in Penetanguishene, Ontario and educated in Timmins, Ottawa, at Khaki University and the University of Toronto. He was a director for the Northern Telephone Company and Spruce Falls Pulp and Paper Company (Kimberly Clark), and joined the Canadian Army in 1943 during World War II, serving with Les Fusiliers de Sherbrooke. Brunelle subsequently worked as a tourism operator at Remi Lake, near Moonbeam.

Politics
He first tried his hand at Federal politics by running in the Canadian election of 1949. He lost to J.A. Bradette in the riding of Cochrane by 2,467 votes. He ran again in 1953 and 1958 losing both times. Shortly after losing the Federal election he entered a provincial by-election in the riding of Cochrane North. This time he won the election.

He served as a backbench supporter for eight years before he was appointed to cabinet as Minister of Lands and Forests on November 24, 1966. In 1972, he was appointed as Minister of Social and Family Services. In 1975 he was shuffled to a Minister without portfolio role. Two years later he was promoted to Provincial Secretary for Resources Development. In 1981 he announced that he was retiring from politics and would not contest the 1981 election.

Cabinet positions

Later life
After leaving politics he was hired by Spruce Falls Power and Paper Co. Ltd. as a consultant. He died in Magog, Quebec at the age of 90. After his retirement from politics, the René Brunelle Provincial Park near Kapuskasing, Ontario was named in his honour.

References

Notes

Citations

External links 
 

1920 births
2010 deaths
Franco-Ontarian people
Members of the Executive Council of Ontario
People from Penetanguishene
People from Cochrane District
Politicians from Simcoe County
Progressive Conservative Party of Ontario MPPs
Provincial Secretaries of Ontario
University of Toronto alumni